Viva Knievel! is a 1977 American action film directed by Gordon Douglas and starring Evel Knievel (as himself), Gene Kelly and Lauren Hutton, with an ensemble supporting cast including Red Buttons, Leslie Nielsen, Cameron Mitchell, Frank Gifford, Dabney Coleman and Marjoe Gortner.

Plot 
Daredevil motorcycle rider Evel Knievel stars as himself in this fictional story. The film opens with  Knievel sneaking into an orphanage late at night to deliver presents: Evel Knievel action figures. One of the boys casts away his crutches, telling Knievel that he'll walk after his accident just as Knievel had.

Knievel then prepares for another of his stunt jumps. We are introduced to his alcoholic mechanic Will Atkins (Gene Kelly), who was a former stunt rider himself before his wife died, driving him to drink. While signing autographs, Knievel is ambushed by photojournalist Kate Morgan (Lauren Hutton), who has been sent to photograph the jump: if Knievel is killed, it will be a great story.

As it happens, Evel does crash while attempting the stunt, and though badly injured, survives. He berates Morgan, announces his retirement, and is taken to the hospital.

While rehabilitating, Knievel resists all attempts to get back on the horse, including those from Jessie (Marjoe Gortner), a former protégé with mysterious backers who want Evel to do a jump in Mexico. Eventually, though, Knievel relents and agrees.

A subplot develops when Will's estranged son Tommy shows up from boarding school, and asks to join the tour. Will, who is reminded of his dead wife, is cold to Tommy, leaving Knievel to show the boy kindness. Likewise, Kate reappears, apologetic for her previous motives, and now wishes that he will never stop jumping.

Meanwhile, Jessie's benefactor is revealed: drug lord Stanley Millard (Leslie Nielsen). Millard (without Jessie's knowledge) plans to cause a fatal accident during the jump. He will then have Knievel's body transported back to America in an exact duplicate of the tour trailer, but one that has a massive supply of drugs hidden in the walls.

Will, however, stumbles onto the plot, is drugged, and sent to a psychiatric ward under the control of the corrupt Ralph Thompson (Dabney Coleman) to prevent him from spilling the beans. Evel sneaks into the ward late at night when Will has dried out, but all Will can remember is that someone knocked him out. Knievel leaves him there to keep whoever is behind the plot in the dark.

As Knievel prepares for the jump (down a massive ramp and over a fire pit), Jessie—hopped up on drugs—confronts Evel, claiming that he will prove who the best jumper is. Jessie knocks Evel out and dresses in Knievel's signature red, white, and blue outfit. Jessie then successfully makes the jump, however, the bike has been sabotaged and he is killed as he lands (footage from a real Knievel crash was used). While the body is taken away for the drug smuggling plot, Evel wakes up, gets on another bike, and goes to free Will.

After breaking out of the psych ward, the two find the mockup trailer, in which, by an amazing coincidence, both Tommy and Kate have been taken hostage. Pursuing the truck, Will and Evel decide to split up: Will will disable the semi, Evel will lead off the gun-toting drug lords riding guard in another car.

At the end of several extended chase scenes, the drug lords are defeated, Will and his son are reunited, and Kate has fallen head over heels for Knievel. The film ends with Knievel performing a daredevil jump over a pit of fire, this time successfully.

The end jump is stopped in a freeze-frame shot and a color matte, similar to that of the one that appears in the opening credits, appears over Evel in mid-air. The song that plays over the opening credits also plays over the film's end credits.

Cast

Production
The production was done under the Irwin Allen banner, with Allen serving as the uncredited Supervisor Producer.  Irwin Allen's wife, Sheila Allen, has a credited role as Sister Charity.

For the more dangerous motorcycle stunts, the producers hired the professional stuntman Gary Charles Davis.  However, Davis' role in the production was kept under wraps to avoid questions about Knievel himself performing his own motorcycle stunts.

The original footage used for Jessie's failed jump was from Evel Knievel's May 1975 crash at Wembley Stadium.

To allow for a love interest to occur with Lauren Hutton's character, Evel is apparently single and there is no mention of Knievel's then-wife, Linda, or his (at the time) three children.

Popular culture reception
The film premiered in June 1977, three months before Knievel and his associates attacked promoter Shelly Saltman with an aluminum baseball bat on September 21, 1977. With Knievel losing most of his sponsorship and marketing deals as a result of the bad publicity, the film became much less commercially attractive, only opening in four further international markets after Knievel's conviction. In addition, the wholesome image of Knievel the movie promoted and the plot point concerning Knievel's promoter being corrupt seemed ill-judged in the light of the events that saw Knievel imprisoned. As a result, the film fell into comparative obscurity until the 2005 DVD release was rediscovered by film review sites such as The A.V. Club and Ruthless Reviews.

In 2013, the film received an internet release with a RiffTrax audio commentary by comedians and Mystery Science Theater 3000 alumni Mike Nelson, Kevin Murphy and Bill Corbett.

References

External links

Review at Stomp Tokyo

1977 films
1977 action films
American action adventure films
Warner Bros. films
Films about stunt performers
Films directed by Gordon Douglas
Films scored by Charles Bernstein
Cultural depictions of Evel Knievel
1970s English-language films
1970s American films